Ophyx inextrema is a moth of the family Erebidae first described by Prout in 1926. It is found in Papua and on Buru in the Maluku Islands.

References

Ophyx
Moths described in 1926
Moths of Indonesia